Bertrand Crasson (born 5 October 1971) is a Belgian football manager and former player who played as a defender, in the position of right-back or centre-back. Most recently he was the manager of Luxemburger team F91 Dudelange.

Club career
Crasson was born in Brussels. He started his career at Anderlecht in 1989. He moved abroad to Serie A club Napoli in 1996, where he remained until 1998, before rejoining his previous side for five more seasons. Crasson then played with Lierse during the 2003–04 season, and FC Brussels the following season, retiring afterwards.

International career
Internationally, Crasson was a member of the Belgium national team squad that took part at the 1998 FIFA World Cup, where he played 22 minutes (as a starter) in the team's 0–0 draw against the Netherlands. In total, he obtained 26 caps between 1991 and 2001, scoring once.

Managerial career
From 2012 to 2018, Crasson worked in a role as Head of Academy Coaching for Police Tero in Thailand.

On 10 September 2019, Crasson was appointed assistant manager of F91 Dudelange under head manager Emilio Ferrera. Just one week after his arrival, Ferrera was fired and Crasson took charge on interim basis.

Honours
Anderlecht
Belgian First Division A: 1990–91, 1992–93, 1993–94, 1994–95, 1999–2000, 2000–01
Belgian Cup: 1993–94
Belgian Super Cup: 1993, 1995, 2000, 2001

Individual
Belgian Young Professional Footballer of the Year: 1990–91

References

External links
 
 
 

1971 births
Living people
Belgian footballers
Belgian expatriate footballers
Belgian football managers
Belgian expatriate football managers
S.S.C. Napoli players
R.S.C. Anderlecht players
R.W.D.M. Brussels F.C. players
Lierse S.K. players
1998 FIFA World Cup players
Belgium international footballers
Serie A players
Belgian Pro League players
Footballers from Brussels
Association football defenders
Belgian expatriate sportspeople in Italy
Expatriate footballers in Italy
Expatriate football managers in Luxembourg
Expatriate football managers in Thailand
F91 Dudelange managers